Rent.com is an apartment search engine and online marketplace catering to millennials. It is owned by RentPath which is in turn owned by Redfin.

History
Rent.com was founded in 1999 as Viva.com. In December 2004, eBay purchased Rent.com for $415 million.

On May 8, 2012, RentPath, then known as Primedia, acquired Rent.com from eBay for approximately $415 million.

In June 2015, as part of an overall re-branding of Rent.com, the site launched its first national advertising campaign featuring comedian and actor J. B. Smoove.

On April 9, 2021, Rent.com, along with its parent company RentPath, was acquired by real estate site Redfin.

On June 21, 2022, RentPath became Rent. and launched a new suite of marketing automation services.

References

External links
 

Renting
Privately held companies based in Georgia (U.S. state)
Online marketplaces of the United States
Companies based in Atlanta
1999 establishments in Georgia (U.S. state)
Internet properties established in 1999
2004 mergers and acquisitions
2012 mergers and acquisitions
American websites